Neil Chanmugam (13 May 1940 – 22 April 2014) was a Sri Lankan cricketer. He played first-class cricket for Ceylon and domestic teams in Sri Lanka between 1960 and 1974.

Chanmugam was educated at S. Thomas' College, Mount Lavinia, and the University of Colombo. He was an off-spin bowler and useful lower-order batsman who toured India with the Ceylon team in 1964-65 and Pakistan in 1966-67. His best first-class bowling figures were 5 for 47 and 3 for 43 in the drawn match against the touring Australians in October 1969, when he dismissed Bill Lawry twice. His highest score was 72 against the West Indians in January 1967, when he and Ian Pieris took Ceylon's first innings score from 290 for 9 to 400 all out.

Chanmugam was also a keen golfer. He served as the manager of the Sri Lankan cricket teams to England in 1984 and Australia in 1984-85. 

He was the director of a television company in Sri Lanka and the director of tea exports at Maharajahs Ltd. He married Oosha de Saram, the daughter of the Ceylon cricket captain Fredrick de Saram, and they had three children.

References

External links
 

1940 births
2014 deaths
Alumni of S. Thomas' College, Mount Lavinia
Alumni of the University of Colombo
Sri Lankan cricketers
Sinhalese Sports Club cricketers
Cricketers from Colombo
All-Ceylon cricketers